The 1966 Bucknell Bison football team was an American football team that represented Bucknell University during the 1966 NCAA College Division football season. Bucknell tied for fourth in the Middle Atlantic Conference, University Division.

In their second year under head coach Carroll Huntress, the Bison compiled a 4–5 record. Bob Marks and Mike Vincent were the team captains.

The Bisons' 2–3 record against MAC University Division opponents earned them a tie with Lafayette for fourth place in the seven-team circuit.

Bucknell played its home games at Memorial Stadium on the university campus in Lewisburg, Pennsylvania.

Schedule

References

Bucknell
Bucknell Bison football seasons
Bucknell Bison football